Desperate Fight Records was an independent record label in existence between 1993 and 2000 in Umeå, Sweden, owned and operated by Dennis Lyxzén and Jose Saxlund. It released records by most of the bands in the huge local Straight edge hardcore scene, known collectively as Umeå Hardcore.

Label discography
DFR#1: Abhinanda - Darkness of Ignorance 
DFR#2: Various artists - Straight Edge as Fuck I 
DFR#3: Doughnuts - Equalize Nature
DFR#4: Abhinanda - Senseless 
DFR#5: Shield - Build Me Up... Melt Me Down... 
DFR#6: Final Exit - Teg 
DFR#7: Purusam - Outbound 
DFR#8: Abhinanda - Neverending Well of Bliss 
DFR#9: Various artists - Straight Edge as Fuck II 
DFR#10: Shield - Vampiresongs 
DFR#11: Separation - 5th Song 
DFR#12: Saidiwas - Saidiwas
DFR#13: Purusam - The Way of the Dying Race 
DFR#14: Step Forward - It Did Make a Difference
DFR#15: Final Exit - Umeå
DFR#16: Abhinanda - Abhinanda
DFR#17: Saidiwas - All Punk Cons 
DFR#18: Various artists - Straight Edge as Fuck III 
DFR#19: Separation - Separationn 
DFR#20: Plastic Pride - Daredevil I Lost 
DFR#21: Purusam - Daybreak Chronicles 
DFR#22: Plastic Pride - No Hot Ashes
DFR#23: Abhinanda - The Rumble

References

External links
 Victory Records; Desperate Fight

Swedish independent record labels
Swedish record labels
Hardcore record labels
Punk record labels